Neomicropteryx kazusana is a species of moth belonging to the family Micropterigidae. It was described by Hashimoto Satoshi in 1992. It is known from Japan (Honshu).

The length of the forewings is 5.4–5.9 mm for males and 5.3–5.9 mm for females.

References

Micropterigidae
Moths described in 1992
Moths of Japan
Endemic fauna of Japan